Pelican Lake is a lake in Crow Wing County, in the U.S. state of Minnesota.

Pelican Lake, a translation of the Ojibwe language name, was so named for the flocks of pelicans seen there.

See also
List of lakes in Minnesota

References

Lakes of Minnesota
Lakes of Crow Wing County, Minnesota